Birch is an extinct town in Eureka County, in the U.S. state of Nevada. Birch is located to the west of the Diamond Mountains, 26 miles northeast of Eureka.

History
The community was named after James E. Birch, a stagecoach line entrepreneur. A post office was established at Birch in 1901, and remained in operation until 1926. In 1941, Birch had 15 inhabitants.

In 2016, Birch consisted of only a few collapsed buildings.

References

External links
 Birch (ghosttowns.com)

Ghost towns in Eureka County, Nevada